Dave Whiteford (born in 1985) is a Scottish-born Hong Kong international rugby union player. Born in Castlecraig, Nigg, Scotland, he played as a Wing for Glasgow Warriors, Melrose, Peebles, Melbourne Rugby Club, Valley and Hong Kong Scottish.

Early life
Whiteford has a degree in marketing from Edinburgh Napier University in Edinburgh. He also has a Masters of Business Administration from Edinburgh Napier University.

Rugby Union career

Amateur career
Whiteford played with Peebles and Melrose at an amateur level. He signed for Melrose at the start of the 2004–05 season.

Whiteford got to the final of the Melrose Sevens in 2004–05 with Melrose RFC. This was repeated in 2008–09.

He won the Scottish Hydro Electric Cup in 2007–08 with Melrose.

In 2009 Whiteford moved to the Southern Hemisphere to play for Melbourne Rugby Club to widen his rugby experience.

Whiteford later played for the amateur clubs Valley, where he won the Hong Kong Premiership in 2011, and Hong Kong Scottish. He took the Hong Kong Scottish side to the Melrose Sevens in 2011 and 2012.

Professional career
He was a back-up player for Glasgow Warriors in the 2008-09 season.

He played for the Warriors in their pre-season matches against Castres Olympique and Béziers in the XV Challenge Vaquerin tournament.

International career
Whiteford played for Scotland U21.

After a period of residency in Hong Kong he became eligible to play for, and represented, the Hong Kong national rugby union team. He played for Hong Kong against Japan on 17 April 2013.

Administration
He was appointed as General Manager of Hong Kong Scottish in 2011 He works for the Scottish Rugby Union as Sponsorship Manager.

References

1985 births
Living people
Glasgow Warriors players
Hong Kong international rugby union players
Hong Kong Scottish RFC players
Melrose RFC players
Peebles RFC players
Rugby union players from Highland (council area)
Scottish rugby union players
Rugby union wings
Naturalised citizens of the People's Republic of China in Hong Kong
Hong Kong rugby union players
People from Ross and Cromarty
Alumni of Edinburgh Napier University
People educated at Tain Royal Academy
Scottish expatriate rugby union players
Scottish expatriate sportspeople in Australia
Scottish expatriate sportspeople in Hong Kong
Expatriate rugby union players in Australia
Expatriate rugby union players in Hong Kong
Valley RFC players